Darechok is a village development committee in Chitwan District in Bagmati Province of southern Nepal. At the time of the 2011 Nepal census it had a population of 9,607 people (4,836 male; 4,771 female) living in 2,029 individual households.

References

Populated places in Chitwan District